Baruch Barzel (March 19, 1976) is an Israeli physicist and applied mathematician at Bar-Ilan University,
a member of the Gonda Multidisciplinary Brain Research Center and of the Bar-Ilan Data Science Institute. His main research areas are statistical physics, complex systems, nonlinear dynamics and network science.
 
In 2013 he introduced the concept of universality in the dynamics of complex networks, showing that complex systems from different domains condense into discrete forms, or universality classes, of dynamic behavior. In the following years, Barzel and colleagues developed a theoretical framework to predict the observed behavior of complex networked systems: their patterns of information flow; the timescales of their signal propagation; their resilience against failures and disruptions and their recoverability.

During the COVID-19 Pandemic Barzel's lab  published the alternating quarantine strategy to mitigate the spread of SARS-CoV-2 alongside continuous socioeconomic activity. The strategy was implemented by several agencies in Israel and around the world.

Academic career 
Barzel completed his Ph.D. in physics at the Hebrew University of Jerusalem, Israel
as a Hoffman Fellow.
He then pursued his postdoctoral training at the Center for Complex Network Research at Northeastern University
and at the Channing Division of Network Medicine, Harvard Medical School. Barzel is a recipient of the Racah prize (2007) and the Krill prize of the Wolf Foundation (2019). Barzel is also an active public lecturer on science and on Judaism, and presents a weekly corner on Jewish thought on Israeli Public Broadcasting Corporation
.

Dr. Barzel's research focuses on the dynamic behavior of complex networks, uncovering universal principles that govern the dynamics of diverse systems, such as disease spreading, gene regulatory networks, protein interactions or population dynamics.

Selected publications

J. Gao, B. Barzel and A.-L. Barabási, "Universal resilience patterns in complex networks", Nature 530, 307 (2016)
U. Harush and B. Barzel, "Dynamic patterns of information flow in complex networks", Nature Communications 8, 2181 (2017)
C. Hens, U. Harush, S. Haber, R. Cohen and B. Barzel, "Spatiotemporal signal propagation in complex networks", Nature Physics (2019)
D. Meidan, N. Schulmann, R. Cohen, S. Haber, E. Yaniv, R. Sarid and B. Barzel, Alternating quarantine for sustainable epidemic mitigation. Nature Communications 12, 220 (2021).
H. Sanhedrai, J. Gao, A. Bashan, M. Schwartz, S. Havlin and B. Barzel, Reviving a failed network through microscopic interventions. Nature Physics 18, 338 (2022).

Public lectures and media coverage

Universal resilience patterns in complex networks in Ynet (Hebrew)
Bar-Ilan Nitzotzot meeting 2015 (Hebrew) "Connecting the world in six steps"
Interview on Channel 20, 2019 (Hebrew)
Network Earth, 2019
Universality in network dynamics in 2Physics 
Predicting the tipping point of complex systems in The Munich eye 
A new framework to predict spatiotemporal signal propagation in complex networks in Phys.org
Profile article on the Complex Network Dynamics lab in Makor Rishon (Hebrew)
Krav Mada radio lecture series in Galei Zahal (Hebrew)
Israeli experts propose radical post-corona exit strategy in Israel21
An alternative quarantine strategy in El Economista
A well-calculated proposal: mathematical proposal to fight COVID-19 and get out of the economic blockade in Aula Magna
More here.

References

External links
Professional Website
Research Publications

Israeli physicists
Israeli mathematicians
Complex systems scientists
1976 births
Living people
Hebrew University of Jerusalem alumni
Probability theorists
Academic staff of Bar-Ilan University